Astro Aruna was a 24-hour Indonesian language television network that was available on the Astro satellite television service.

Indonesian dramas and soaps were popular on this network, and they were broadcast around the clock. All of the Indonesian shows on Astro Aruna were produced by SinemArt, Diwangkara Film, E-Motion Entertainment, Frame Ritz, Indika Entertainment, Karnos Film, Kharisma Starvision Plus, MD Entertainment, Mizan Productions, Prima Entertainment, Rapi Films, Screenplay Productions, Soraya Intercine Films, Tripar Multivision Plus and Verona Pictures. It was the only television network to broadcast entirely in the Indonestian language at the time.

History

Opening

Singapore on StarHub TV
Astro Aruna was launched from StarHub TV a subsidiary of StarHub on channel 83 in Singapore on 1 January 2005. It was launched from Astro Nusantara on channel 40 in Indonesia on 15 June 2006 and from Astro on channel 121 in Malaysia and Brunei (Kristal-Astro) on 31 August 2006 in Malaysia and Brunei. Later, Astro Aruna was launched from Mio TV a subsidiary of Singapore Telecommunications on channel 35 in Singapore on 6 October 2008.

Closing

Astro Aruna ceased transmission from StarHub TV a subsidiary of StarHub on Channel 83 in Singapore on 31 March 2007. It was replaced by Astro Prima from 1 October 2012 on Singtel mio TV Channel 602. Astro Aruna ceased transmission from Astro Nusantara on channel 40 in Indonesia on 20 October 2008. It ceased transmission from Astro in Malaysia and Brunei (Kristal-Astro) on 1 February 2010.

Programming Line Up

2005-2006
 Love in Bombay (Indosiar, 2002-2003)
 Flamboyan 108 (Indosiar, 1996-1997)
 Permata Hati (SCTV, 2001)
 Kasmaran (SCTV, 2000)
 Abad 21 (Indosiar, 1996-1997)
 Bukan Perempuan Biasa (RCTI,1997)
 Kecupan Kangen (RCTI,2006)
 Permataku
 Sang Bintang
 Cantik
 Terlanjur Sayang
 Bunga di Tepi Jalan (RCTI,2006)
 Pernikahan Dini (RCTI,2001-2002)
 Cinta Tiada Akhir (SCTV, 2005-2006)
 Sephia (SCTV, 2002)
 Siapa Takut Jatuh Cinta (SCTV, 2002)
 Bukan Cinderella (SCTV, 2003-2004)
 Malam Pertama (SCTV, 2003-2004)
 Liontin (RCTI,2005-2006)
 Bintang (RCTI,2006)
 Inikah Rasanya? (SCTV, 2004-2006)
 Bintang Di Surga
 Bayangan Adinda (SCTV, 2003-2004)
 Buah Hati yang Hilang (MNCTV, 2001-2002)
 Gadis Mencari Cinta (RCTI, 2003)
 Dua Cinta
 Bumi dan Langit
 Satu Hati Satu Cinta
 Fitri Buah Hatiku
 Hati ini Milikmu
 Nyanyian Cinta
 Doaku Harapanku 1 (RCTI, 1998-1999)
 Doaku Harapanku 2 (RCTI, 1999-2000)
 Doa Membawa Berkah (Indosiar, 2000)
 Nyanyian Cinta
 Wah Cantiknya (SCTV, 2001-2002)
 Bidadari (RCTI,2000-2005)
 Si Cecep (SCTV, 2003-2004)

2007
 Cinta Tanpa Logika
 Akhir Cinta
 Tabir Tiga Gadis
 Ibu
 Ruang Hati
 Semusim
 Amara
 Menanti Surga
 Salah Mencinta
 Dunia Belum Kiamat
 Nyonya Nyonya Sosilita
 Hati ini Milikmu
 Cinta Dua Dunia
 Perempuan
 Api Cinta
 Pereumpuan
 Sejuta Rasa Sayang

2008-2010, 2010-2012
 Karena Cinta
 Elegi
 1:3
 Rahasia Gadis
 Serpihan
 Jinny oh Jinny (RCTI, 1997-2002)
 Jin & Jun (RCTI, 1996-2002)
 Tuyul & Mbak Yul (RCTI, 1997-2002)
 Al Kausar (Tayangan Serentak di Astro Prima dan Astro Oasis) 
 Pesantren Cinta
 Salah Mencinta
 Janjiku (RCTI, 1997)
 Cinta Di Awal Tiga Puluh (Indosiar, 1998)
 Cintailah Daku (SCTV, 1998)
 Cinta Dara Kembar (RCTI, 1998)
 Cinta (RCTI, 1999)
 Jangan Ucapkan Cinta (RCTI, 1999-2000)
 Janji Hati (SCTV, 1999-2000)
 Cinta Tak Pernah Salah (RCTI, 2000-2001)
 Maha Pengasih (SCTV, 2001)
 Titipan Ilahi (Indosiar, 2004)
 Senandung Masa Puber (Trans TV, 2004-2005)
 Halusinasi
 Cinta Seorang Ayah
 Ia Yang Terindah
 Cowok Cantik
 Sandra
 IQ Cowok Gue
 Loni Cantik Maukah
 Ancur Banget
 Kamu Jadi Pacarku
 Gengsi Gede-gedean (Indosiar, 2004-2005)
 Panji Manusia Millenium (RCTI, 1999-2001)
 Indera ke-6 (RCTI, 2001-2002)
 Ibu Untuk Anakku
 Mentari
 Suami-Suami Takut Istri (Trans TV, 2007-2009)
 Akibat Banyak Gaul (RCTI, 2002-2003)
 Roman Picisan
 Mewarnai Langit
 Pacar Pilihan
 Wah Cantiknya 2 (SCTV, 2002)
 Tersanjung 1-6 (Indosiar, 1998-2006)
 Cinderella Pulang Pagi
 Cinta Indah 1-2
 Mukjizat Allah
 Cinta & Coklat
 Satu Hati Satu Cinta
 Angin Tak Dapat Membaca (RCTI, 1996-1997)
 Mengappai Mimpi
 Senyuman Anda
 Tangisan Anak Tiri
 Superfone (SCTV, 2003-2004)
 Bonekka Poppy (SCTV, 2000-2002)
 Mat Jiung
 Terajana
 Inikah Cinta
 Lukisan Jiwa
 Tawakal (Indosiar, 2005)
 Indahnya Karuniamu (Indosiar, 2007)
 Mata ke Tiga
 Hitam Putih
 Sweet 17
 Air mata Ibu (RCTI, 1998)
 Setinggi Bintang
 M-Club
 Tanpa Saksi Mata (RCTI, 2003)
 Gadis Mencari Cinta (RCTI, 2003)
 Sakaratul Maut (SCTV, 2004-2005)
 Cinta Fitri Season 1 (on MediaCorp TV12 Suria)
 Cinta Fitri Season 2 (on MediaCorp TV Channel 5)
 Cinta Fitri Season 3 (on Sensasi)
 Cinta Fitri Season Ramadhan
 Cinta Fitri seasons 5-7 (on MediaCorp TV Channel 5)
 Hikmah 1 (RCTI,2003)
 Hikmah 2 (on MediaCorp TV12 Suria) (RCTI,2004)
 Hikmah 3 (on Sensasi) (RCTI,2005)
 Tuyul Millenium (SCTV, 2002-2003)
 Senandung Masa Puber (Trans TV, 2003-2004)
 Arung dan Si Kaya (ANTV, 2005)
 Metropolis (RCTI,2002-2003)
 Rahasia Gadis
 Anak & Ibuku (Indosiar, 2000-2001)
 Senandung (Indosiar, 2000-2001)
 Kapuk Wingi
 Begu Jagang
 Kiamat Nya Robeng
 Ratu Parasik
 Misteri Tawan Karib
 Dewa (RCTI, 2010-2011)
 Kepompong (SCTV, 2008-2009)
 Mutiara Hati (SCTV, 2005-2006)
 Arti Sahabat (Indosiar, 2010) (Tayangan Serentak di Astro Prima dan TV9 (Malaysia))
 Buku Harian Baim (SCTV, 2010)
 Asmara
 Anugerah (RCTI, 2010-2011)
 Yusra dan Yumna (RCTI, 2011)
 Putri yang Ditukar (RCTI, 2011)
 Pesantren & Rock n' Roll (SCTV, 2011)
 Garuda Impian (SCTV, 2011)
 Calon Bini (SCTV, 2011)
 2 Dewi
 Ku Pinang Kau Dengan Bismillah (SCTV, 2011)
 Janji Cinta Aisha (SCTV, 2011)
 Putih Abu-Abu (SCTV, 2012)
 Anissa dan Anissa
 Cinta Salsabilla
 Badil & Blangkon Ajaib (SCTV, 2012)
 Otomatis Jatuh Cinta
 Aliya (SCTV, 2012)
 Cahaya Gemilang (SCTV, 2012)
 Dia Atau Diriku (SCTV, 2012)
 Gol Gol Fatimah (SCTV, 2012)
 Baim Jaim (SCTV, 2012)
 Tukang Bubur Naik Haji The Series (Indonesia) (Tayangan Serentak di Astro Prima)

Broadcast rights

References

Television channels and stations established in 2005
Astro Malaysia Holdings television channels
Television channels and stations disestablished in 2012